The 1973–74 Norwegian 1. Divisjon season was the 35th season of ice hockey in Norway. Ten teams participated in the league, and Hasle-Loren Idrettslag won the championship.

First round

Second round

Final round

Final tiebreaker 
 Hasle-Løren Idrettslag - Frisk Asker 3:0

Relegation round

External links 
 Norwegian Ice Hockey Federation

Nor
GET-ligaen seasons
1973 in Norwegian sport
1974 in Norwegian sport